The 2000 Checker Auto Parts/Dura Lube 500k was the 32nd stock car race of the 2000 NASCAR Winston Cup Series and the 52nd iteration of the event. The race was held on Sunday, November 5, 2000, in Avondale, Arizona at Phoenix International Raceway, a 1-mile (1.6 km) permanent low-banked tri-oval race track. The race took the scheduled 312 laps to complete. At race's end, Jeff Burton, driving for Roush Racing, would charge to the front on the final restart with 11 to go to win his 15th career NASCAR Winston Cup Series win and the third and final win of his season. To fill out the podium, Jeremy Mayfield, driving for Penske-Kranefuss Racing, and Steve Park, driving for Dale Earnhardt, Inc., would finish second and third, respectively.

Background 

Phoenix International Raceway – also known as PIR – is a one-mile, low-banked tri-oval race track located in Avondale, Arizona. It is named after the nearby metropolitan area of Phoenix. The motorsport track opened in 1964 and currently hosts two NASCAR race weekends annually. PIR has also hosted the IndyCar Series, CART, USAC and the Rolex Sports Car Series. The raceway is currently owned and operated by International Speedway Corporation.

The raceway was originally constructed with a 2.5 mi (4.0 km) road course that ran both inside and outside of the main tri-oval. In 1991 the track was reconfigured with the current 1.51 mi (2.43 km) interior layout. PIR has an estimated grandstand seating capacity of around 67,000. Lights were installed around the track in 2004 following the addition of a second annual NASCAR race weekend.

Entry list 

 (R) denotes rookie driver.

Practice

First practice 
The first practice session was held on Friday, November 3, at 10:30 AM MST. The session would last for 55 minutes.

Second practice 
The second practice session was held on Friday, November 3, at 12:35 PM MST. The session would last for 50 minutes.

Third practice 
The third practice session was held on Saturday, November 4, at 8:30 AM MST. The session would last for one hour.

Fourth and final practice 
The final practice session, sometimes referred to as Happy Hour, was held on Saturday, November 4, at 10:30 AM MST. The session would last for one hour.

Qualifying 
Qualifying was split into two rounds. The first round was held on Friday, November 3, at 2:15 PM MST. Each driver would have one lap to set a time. During the first round, the top 25 drivers in the round would be guaranteed a starting spot in the race. If a driver was not able to guarantee a spot in the first round, they had the option to scrub their time from the first round and try and run a faster lap time in a second round qualifying run, held on Saturday, November 4, at 12:15 PM MST. As with the first round, each driver would have a lap to set a time. Positions 26-36 would be decided on time, while positions 37-43 would be based on provisionals. Six spots are awarded by the use of provisionals based on owner's points. The seventh is awarded to a past champion who has not otherwise qualified for the race. If no past champion needs the provisional, the next team in the owner points will be awarded a provisional.

Five drivers would fail to qualify: Stacy Compton, Steve Grissom, Robby Gordon, Dave Marcis, and Hut Stricklin.

Full qualifying results

Race results

References 

2000 NASCAR Winston Cup Series
NASCAR races at Phoenix Raceway
November 2000 sports events in the United States
2000 in sports in Arizona